The large moth family Crambidae contains the following genera beginning with "B":

References 

Lists of Lepidoptera genera
 B